Fallen Angels: Six Noir Tales Told for Television is a 1993 anthology, published by Grove Press as a tie-in to the Showtime television series Fallen Angels that appeared in the fall of 1993.

The book contains six stories by six masters of hard-boiled noir and the teleplays for their film adaptations.

The hard-boiled stories were written by: Raymond Chandler, Jim Thompson, William Campbell Gault, Cornell Woolrich, Jonathan Craig and James Ellroy.

Preface: by James Ellroy.

Stories
"Dead End for Delia," by William Campbell Gault.
"I'll Be Waiting," by Raymond Chandler.
"The Quiet Room," by Jonathan Craig.
"The Frightening Frammis," by Jim Thompson.
"Murder Obliquely," by Cornell Woolrich.
"Since I Don't Have You," by James Ellroy.

Screenplays
"Dead End for Delia," by Scott Frank.
"I'll Be Waiting," by C. Gaby Mitchell.
"The Quiet Room," by Howard A. Rodman.
"The Frightening Frammis," by Jon Robin Baitz and Howard A. Rodman.
"Murder Obliquely," by Amanda Silver.
"Since I Don't Have You," by Steven Katz.

See also
 Fallen Angels.
 List of Fallen Angels episodes.

1993 anthologies
Mystery anthologies
Screenplays